The Scottish Vintage Bus Museum is a transport museum in Lathalmond, 2.5 miles north of Dunfermline, Fife. The museum is open every Sunday between Easter and the start of October.

History

The museum was established in 1986 in Whitburn, West Lothian, before moving to its current location at Lathalmond, formerly part of the Royal Navy Stores Depot, in 1995. The museum owns half of the site at Lathalmond which is around 45 acres.

Collection

There are around 160 buses, the majority of which date from the 1920s and 1930s. The collection also includes around 30 other vehicles. These vehicles include a small railway collection which is on loan to the museum from the Scottish Railway Preservation Society, a collection of classic cars and lorries, a restored steam roller and a restored horse tram.

The museum is a registered charity and the collection is managed by a board made up of mainly trustees.

References

1986 establishments in Scotland
Transport museums in Scotland
Museums established in 1986
Buildings and structures in Dunfermline